The Turkey national rugby league team represents Turkey in international rugby league. The team played their first match in 2018.

History 
The Turkish Rugby League Association was founded in 2016, however the team didn't play their first match until two years later. The side made their competition debut at the 2018 Emerging Nations World Championship in Sydney, defeating the Solomon Islands 30–22 in their first ever match. The team also beat Japan 60–0, qualifying them for the tournament's trophy stage. Here, they lost to the Philippines 29–16 in the semi final before beating Vanuatu 27–26, winning thanks to a field goal from Adem Baskonyali and claiming seventh place at their inaugural competition.

In 2019, the team played their first match in Turkey, losing to Greece 38–24 at the Aysekadin Yerleskesi Futbol Stadium in Istanbul. They also lost to Malta 28–12 six weeks after.

Current squad
Squad for the 2018 Emerging Nations World Championship:

Aidan Sezer
Jansin Turgut
Emre Guler
Yusuf Dagdanasar
Adem Baskonyali
Arda Dalcik
Ibrahim Korana
Berat Kaya
Volkan Er
Saxon Onur
Koray Kokten
Ethem Coskun
Ata Doruk Celiktutan
Atalay Alcay
Erdem Cagdas
Alican Acar
Errol Carter
Huseyin Sasmaz
Ali Bokeyhan Surer
Volkan Isik
Yasin Ozyurtkan
Enes Ertan
Ercan Haghi
Akin Konak
Alper Karabork
Huseyin Karabork
Emre Kutup
Kenan Tarpis
Lachlan Hughes
Samuel Hughes
Aydin Salman-Cochrane
Jaydin Salman-Cochrane
Presley Salman-Cochrane
Semih Parlak

Record

All-time results record
Below is table of the official representative rugby league matches played by Turkey at test level up until 17 October 2021:

References

Men's
National rugby league teams